Eressa ypleta is a moth of the family Erebidae. It was described by Charles Swinhoe in 1892. It is found on Waigeo in Indonesia.

References

Eressa
Moths described in 1892